Chenar Bon (also Romanized as Chenār Bon) is a village in Mazkureh Rural District, in the Central District of Sari County, Mazandaran Province, Iran. At the 2006 census, its population was 348, in 103 families.

References 

Populated places in Sari County